Shelby Cannon (born August 19, 1966) is an American retired professional tennis player.  

Cannon enjoyed most of his tennis success while playing doubles. During his career, he won three doubles titles and finished runner-up an additional six times. He achieved a career-high doubles ranking of World No. 27 in 1993.

Cannon played college tennis for the Tennessee Volunteers. While on tour, Cannon kept a residence in Ponte Vedra Beach, Florida.

Grand Slam, Grand Prix and ATP Tour finals

Doubles (3 titles, 6 runner-ups)

External links
 
 

American male tennis players
Sportspeople from Hattiesburg, Mississippi
People from Ponte Vedra Beach, Florida
Tennessee Volunteers men's tennis players
Tennis people from Florida
Tennis people from Mississippi
US Open (tennis) champions
Living people
1966 births
Grand Slam (tennis) champions in mixed doubles